James John Quill was an American football player and coach. He was a graduate of both Amherst College in Amherst, Massachusetts and the Yale Law School. Quill's hit on Francis Burr in the 1905 Harvard–Yale football game was a catalyst for major reforms in the game of college football. He served as the head football coach at Sewanee: The University of the South in 1906, compiling a record of 8–1.

Head coaching record

References

Year of birth missing
Year of death missing
Amherst Mammoths football players
Sewanee Tigers football coaches
Yale Bulldogs football players
Yale Law School alumni